The Independent is a 2000 mockumentary comedy film directed by Stephen Kessler and starring Jerry Stiller and Janeane Garofalo.  Stiller portrays an independent film maker who makes little-known B movies with titles like Twelve Angry Men and a Baby. The film spoofs independent directors and independent film.  The film features Max Perlich and cameos by Anne Meara, Ron Howard, Roger Corman, Peter Bogdanovich, John Lydon, Ben Stiller, Andy Dick, Fred Dryer, Jonathan Katz, Fred Williamson, Karen Black, Nick Cassavetes, Julie Strain and adult film actress Ginger Lynn. The fictional career of Morty Fineman (Stiller) includes having made 427 films, although it is not specified as to whether he directed them all or if it refers to films produced or written by the Fineman character. The theme song The Love Song For 'The Independent' is performed by Nancy Sinatra.

The film premiered at the 2000 South by Southwest Film Festival, and released to theatres on November 30, 2001.

Reception 
On review aggregator website Rotten Tomatoes, the film holds an approval rating of 60% based on 48 reviews. On Metacritic, which assigns a normalized rating to reviews, the film has a weighted average score of 52 out of 100, based on 17 critics, indicating "mixed or average reviews".

External links

References

2000 films
2000 comedy films
American mockumentary films
American independent films
Films set in California
Films about filmmaking
American comedy films
2000s English-language films
2000s American films